Lake Ruhondo is a lake of northwestern Rwanda. It is located near Lake Bulera on the outskirts of Musanze. It is located at the base of Rwanda's largest volcano, the Kalisimbi Volcanic mountain.

Lake Ruhondo and is one of two lakes formed out of volcanic activity from Sabyinyo Volcanic mountain which caused outpouring of lava across a river valley that solidified and cooled.  Lake Ruhondo is separated from Lake Burera by a 1 km land mass. Both lakes Ruhondo and Burera are located in the Northern part of Rwanda and very close to Uganda on Rwanda's northern region.  Lake Ruhondo straddles three districts namely: Burera Musanze and Gakenke.  Lake Ruhondo receives its waters from Lake Burera at its southwestern extremity.  It has an estimated area of 2800 ha.  Lake Ruhondo receives water from other streams and drains to the southwest through the River Mukungwa which is a tributary of River Nyabarongo.
Lake Burera and Ruhondo are separated by a 1 km land mass.
Water transportation is not well developed with individual small wooden boats as the means of transport.

References

2. Rwanda Natural Resources Authority, Burera and Ruhondo Development Plan. https://rwandalanduse.rnra.rw/portal/sharing/rest/content/items/bdf78d97d2f4446eb973d45fae7a6013/data

Lakes of Rwanda
Ramsar sites in Rwanda